The 1998–99 Liechtenstein Cup was the fifty-fourth season of Liechtenstein's annual cup competition. Seven clubs competed with a total of sixteen teams for one spot in the qualifying round of the UEFA Cup. Defending champions were FC Vaduz, who have won the cup continuously since the previous season.

First round

|}

Quarterfinals 

|}

Semifinals 

|}

Final

References

External links
Official site of the LFV
RSSSF page

Liechtenstein Football Cup seasons
Cup
Liechtenstein Cup